The 2017–18 VCU Rams men's basketball team represented Virginia Commonwealth University during the 2017–18 NCAA Division I men's basketball season. The Rams were led by Mike Rhoades in his first season as head coach at VCU. The Rams played their home games at Stuart C. Siegel Center in Richmond, Virginia as members of the Atlantic 10 Conference.

A chain of lost recruiting classes, coaching personnel changes, losses against low RPI teams, no wins against Top 50 RPI teams, and a graduating core of players resulted in a downturn in the team's fortunes. The team finished the season 18–15, 9–9 record in A-10 play to finish in a four-way tie for fifth place. The season was the 18th consecutive season the program finished with a winning record. As the No. 8 seed in the A-10 tournament, the Rams defeated Dayton in the second round before losing to Rhode Island in the quarterfinals.

The Rams failed to qualify for the NCAA tournament for the first time since 2010, and failed to achieve a 20-win season for the first time since 2006. On March 11, 2018, Ed McLaughlin, the Athletics Director announced that VCU had declined an invitation to play in the College Basketball Invitational tournament. This marked the first season since 2006 the Rams did not play in a postseason tournament.

Previous season
The Rams finished the 2016–17 season 26–9, 14–4 in A-10 play to finish in second place. VCU defeated George Mason and Richmond in the A-10 tournament to advance to the championship game, where they lost to Rhode Island. They earned an at-large bid to the NCAA tournament as the No. 10 seed in the West Region. There they lost to No. 7 Saint Mary's in the first round.

Head coach Will Wade resigned on March 20 to take the head coaching position at LSU following the firing of Johnny Jones. Wade was the head coach for the two seasons, making him VCU's shortest tenured head coach since Benny Dees. On March 21, the school hired Rice head coach Mike Rhoades, who had been the associate head coach under Shaka Smart from 2009–2014.

Offseason

Departures

Transfers

2017 recruiting class

2018 Recruiting class

Roster

Preseason 
In a poll of the league's head coaches and select media members at the conference's media day, the Rams were picked to finish in fourth place in the A-10. Justin Tillman was named to the conference's preseason first team. Tillman and Jonathan Williams were named to the preseason All-Defensive team.

Schedule and results 

|-
!colspan=12 style=| Exhibition

|-
!colspan=12 style=| Non-conference regular season

|-
!colspan=12 style=| Atlantic 10 regular season

|-
!colspan=12 style=| Atlantic 10 tournament

References

External links 
VCU Basketball

VCU
VCU Rams men's basketball seasons
VCU Rams men's basketball
VCU Rams men's basketball